Ørnulv Ødegård (12 April 1901 – 23 February 1983) was a Norwegian psychiatrist. He was the director of Gaustad Hospital from 1938 to 1972. He was involved as an expert during the trial against Hamsun. He is known for his studies on women who fraternized with German soldiers during the occupation of Norway, where he concluded that their level of intelligence was lower than average. He has also been criticized for the practice of lobotomizing of mental patients.

References

1901 births
1986 deaths
Physicians from Oslo
Norwegian psychiatrists
20th-century Norwegian physicians